The Sorel Royaux were a Canadian minor pro ice hockey team in Sorel-Tracy, Quebec. They played in the Quebec Semi-Pro Hockey League from 1996-2004. The club was founded in 1996 as the Sorel Dinosaures, they changed their name to Sorel Royaux in 1999.

External links
 The Internet Hockey Database

Ice hockey teams in Quebec
Quebec Semi-Pro Hockey League teams
Sport in Sorel-Tracy
Ice hockey clubs established in 1996
Sports clubs disestablished in 2004
1996 establishments in Quebec
2004 disestablishments in Quebec